Flight 501 may refer to:

Pacific Western Airlines Flight 501, caught fire during takeoff on 22 March 1984
LANSA Flight 501, crashed on 27 April 1966
Ariane 5 Flight 501, a launch failure of the spacecraft Cluster on 4 June 1996

0501